KF Vora is an Albanian football club based in Vorë in the Tirana District. The club was founded in 1989 and they currently participate in the Kategoria e Dytë.

Current squad

Honours

Kategoria e Dytë: (2)
2017–18, 2019–20

Kategoria e Tretë: (1)
2011–12

References

Football clubs in Albania
Association football clubs established in 2011
2011 establishments in Albania
FK Vora
Albanian Third Division clubs
Kategoria e Dytë clubs